[
  {
    "type": "Feature",
    "geometry": { "type": "Point", "coordinates": [103.79910,  1.46469] },
    "properties": {
      "title": "Senoko Power Station",
      "description": "",
      "marker-symbol": "industrial",
      "marker-size": "small",
      "marker-color": "#ff0000"
    }
  },
  {
    "type": "Feature",
    "geometry": { "type": "Point", "coordinates": [103.6418,  1.2889] },
    "properties": {
      "title": "Tuas Power Station",
      "marker-symbol": "industrial",
      "marker-size": "small",
      "marker-color": "#ff0000"
    }
  },
  {
    "type": "Feature",
    "geometry": { "type": "Point", "coordinates": [103.7276,  1.2791] },
    "properties": {
      "title": "Pulau Seraya Power Station",
      "marker-symbol": "industrial",
      "marker-size": "small",
      "marker-color": "#ff0000"
    }
  },
  {
    "type": "Feature",
    "geometry": { "type": "Point", "coordinates": [103.72384,  1.28361] },
    "properties": {
      "title": "PacificLight Power",
      "marker-symbol": "industrial",
      "marker-size": "small",
      "marker-color": "#ffff00"
    }
  },
  {
    "type": "Feature",
    "geometry": { "type": "Point", "coordinates": [103.669222,  1.258722] },
    "properties": {
      "title": "Sembcorp Cogen @ Banyan",
      "marker-symbol": "industrial",
      "marker-size": "small",
      "marker-color": "#ffff00"
    }
  },
  {
    "type": "Feature",
    "geometry": { "type": "Point", "coordinates": [103.702824,  1.255542] },
    "properties": {
      "title": "Pulau Sakra Power Station",
      "marker-symbol": "industrial",
      "marker-size": "small",
      "marker-color": "#ffff00"
    }
  },
  {
    "type": "Feature",
    "geometry": { "type": "Point", "coordinates": [103.710642,1.311327] },
    "properties": {
      "title": "Jurong Power Station",
      "marker-symbol": "industrial",
      "marker-size": "small",
      "marker-color": "#ffff00"
    }
  },
  {
    "type": "Feature",
    "geometry": { "type": "Point", "coordinates": [103.67492,1.28197] },
    "properties": {
      "title": "Keppel Merlimau Cogen Power Station",
      "marker-symbol": "industrial",
      "marker-size": "small",
      "marker-color": "#ffff00"
    }
  },
  {
    "type": "Feature",
    "geometry": { "type": "Point", "coordinates": [103.62098,1.2977] },
    "properties": {
      "title": "Keppel Seghers Tuas Waste-to-Energy Plant",
      "marker-symbol": "industrial",
      "marker-size": "small",
      "marker-color": "#00ff00"
    }
  },
  {
    "type": "Feature",
    "geometry": { "type": "Point", "coordinates": [103.79573,1.46222] },
    "properties": {
      "title": "Senoko Incineration Plant",
      "marker-symbol": "industrial",
      "marker-size": "small",
      "marker-color": "#00ff00"
    }
  },
  {
    "type": "Feature",
    "geometry": { "type": "Point", "coordinates": [103.63522,1.32521] },
    "properties": {
      "title": "Tuas Incineration Plant",
      "marker-symbol": "industrial",
      "marker-size": "small",
      "marker-color": "#00ff00"
    }
  },
  {
    "type": "Feature",
    "geometry": { "type": "Point", "coordinates": [103.62051,1.29619] },
    "properties": {
      "title": "Tuas South Incineration Plant",
      "marker-symbol": "industrial",
      "marker-size": "small",
      "marker-color": "#00ff00"
    }
  }
]The majority of electricity in Singapore comes from natural gas power plants.

List by fuel

Oil-fired Thermal

Gas

Waste to energy

Solar

See also

Energy in Singapore
Electricity sector in Singapore
List of largest power stations in the world

References

Singapore
Power stations